Greggs plc is a British bakery chain. It specialises in savoury products such as bakes,  sausage rolls, sandwiches and sweet items including doughnuts and vanilla slices. It is headquartered in Newcastle upon Tyne, England. It is listed on the London Stock Exchange, and is a constituent of the FTSE 250 Index. Originally a high street chain, it has since entered the convenience and drive-thru markets, this achieved mainly through its partnership with EG Group.

History

Early history
Greggs was founded by John Gregg as a Tyneside bakery in 1939. It opened its first shop in Gosforth, Newcastle upon Tyne in 1951. When Gregg died in 1964, the bakery was taken over by his son, Ian, assisted by his disgraced brother, Colin. Major expansion began soon after, including the acquisitions of other bakeries such as Glasgow-based Rutherglen in 1972, Leeds-based Thurston's in 1974, Broomfields the Bakers, London, Bowketts the Bakers in Kent, Tooks the Bakers (East Anglia) and Price's (Manchester) in 1976.

Expansion
In 1994, the company acquired the Bakers Oven chain of bakers' shops from Allied Bakeries. In 1999, Greggs rebranded its one hundred Braggs shops as Greggs of the Midlands, and its Leeds-based Thurston chain as Greggs of Yorkshire.

In 2008, Greggs rebranded its 165 Bakers Oven shops as Greggs so they could benefit from its national advertising campaign. The company opened its 1,500th premises, in York, in 2011.

In 2013, Greggs replaced its CEO Ken McMeikan with Punch Taverns CEO Roger Whiteside. McMeikan left the firm for Brake Bros.

In 2013, Greggs began to transition out of the bakery market, reasoning that it couldn't compete with supermarkets on that front. Instead, the company switched to focusing solely on "food on the go" after discovering that 80% of its business was in that market. Many of its stores now open earlier and close later, in order to target those going to and coming back from work, expanding its breakfast menu, and discontinuing the sale of bread and scones in many of its stores.

In 2014, the company requested help from Google when an image of the Greggs logo, altered to include a parodic fake slogan referring to the firm's customers as "scum", was presented in Google search results as the actual company logo – falling afoul of imperfections in the "Google algorithm". The firm's lighthearted social media response, which included a tweet sent to Google's official Twitter account offering doughnuts in exchange for fixing the problem, was noted as a "lesson in Twitter crisis management".

In 2016, Greggs moved their head office from Jesmond, Newcastle upon Tyne to Quorum Business Park, Longbenton, North Tyneside. 

In that same year, Colin Gregg was accused of preying upon children, partly using his philanthropic role within the company. Eventually, he was convicted in March 2017 on nine counts of indecent assault and was sentenced to imprisonment until at least 2030.

In 2020, all shops closed in response to the COVID-19 pandemic.

In 2022, Greggs opened its largest location in a Primark store in Birmingham. A queue formed outside the shop 30 minutes before the grand opening, with some people running under the barriers as they were opened. A collaborative clothing range, "Greggs X Primark", was also released.

COVID-19 impact 
In response to the ongoing disruption, Greggs was forced to close all stores on 24 March 2020, furloughing most of its employees. On 24 April 2020, it was decided Greggs were carrying out a controlled trial of 20 stores in Newcastle with regard to safety measures taken in response to COVID-19. This was later called off; due to the amount of press coverage it was deemed dangerous and trials were carried out behind closed doors at undisclosed locations throughout the UK.

After a successful trial Greggs announced it was opening 800 shops around 15 June 2020, with all the new measures in place which include perspex screens, social distancing markers and door staff. The company has also said reduced trading hours and a reduced menu will be in place until further notice. Greggs opened all shops with the new measures near the end of July 2020. Some food items were reintroduced to the menu in September 2020. In November 2020, the company announced it would be cutting 820 jobs due to the COVID-19 pandemic that affected the company's sales.

Operations

In 2019, the chain had over 2,000 outlets, nine regional bakeries that make products local to the area, like Scotch Pie in Scotland, and also employed 22,000 staff. Some items are only sold in particular regions. The company also sells some of its products – such as bakes, melts and pasties – through the supermarket chain Iceland.

Delivery service and Click & Collect
In October 2016, Greggs announced that it would be launching a delivery service on a trial basis, with plans to implement it nationwide if the trial proved to be successful. The initial trial was held in Cobalt Business Park in North Tyneside, and the next trial phase encompassed the city's other 29 Greggs stores.

Greggs Drive Thru and 24-hour openings
In June 2017, Greggs opened their first Drive-through, at Irlam Gateway Service Station in Salford. Three further outlets have since opened in Ashby-de-la-Zouch, Blackburn and Newcastle. Greggs are trialing certain drive-thru stores being open 24 hours a day.

Greggs Moment Stores
In September 2011, Greggs opened its first Greggs Moment, a 104-seater coffee shop, in its home town of Newcastle on Northumberland Street. This store was then followed by one in the nearby MetroCentre in August 2012, with five outlets in operation by February 2013. In August 2013, the company announced that it would discontinue its attempt to enter the coffee market, and instead focus on selling coffee from its existing stores.

Greggs Outlet 
Greggs also has a small number of outlet shops in Northern and Central England and one in Wales, selling unsold stock, mis-shapes and factory rejects at a discounted price, under the name Greggs Outlet. They were started in 1972 in Arthur's Hill, Newcastle under the name of the Greggs ‘Seconds’ shop.

Products

Sausage rolls, pizza and  pastries
The company's best selling product is the sausage roll, selling more than two million units weekly. Greggs sell sausage rolls freshly baked individually, or in a pre-baked cold pack of four.

Vegan products

Greggs launched a vegan sausage roll in January 2019, made with vegan Quorn. Greggs have a partnership with the Quorn company. Following the release of the vegan sausage roll Greggs had very strong core growth throughout the UK, "paving the way for other fast food chains to add a vegan option to their menus." In January 2020 it was announced that the chain would give 25,000 employees a bonus of up to £300 each (totalling £7m) after the vegan sausage roll boosted sales and profits.

In January 2020, the chain launched a meat-free version of its steak bake.

Breakfast menu
Greggs offer a variety of breakfast items which are served until 11 am. Bacon rolls and porridge were introduced to their stores in 2010 alongside continental items including croissants and pains au chocolat.

Seasonal ranges
Greggs regularly introduces seasonal menus which include new product lines. In 2015, they began offering chicken curry soup and peri peri chicken flatbread as part of an autumn line.

This line offers a variety of pasta dishes, sandwiches, salads and soups and includes both meat-free products and products containing meat. The range also includes low fat snacks such as yoghurt pots and pots of fruit, and light drinks such as lemonade and fruit juices.

The first gluten free products were launched with the autumn/winter menu in 2016 and included a range of cakes, brownies and crispy rolls. Their Halloween product line includes fairy buns, cakes, biscuits, lattices and gingerbread kits.

Their Christmas menu includes bakes, rolls, soups, toasties, baguettes, biscuits, muffins, buns and mince pies.

Sandwiches
Greggs produce a variety of sandwiches which are all freshly prepared in-store every day and available to purchase hot or cold.

Soup
Greggs' soups are part of the company's healthy eating menu. The soups are seasonal, the different types served throughout the year including chicken curry soup, spiced beef and rice soup, and cream of tomato soup. In Channel 4's Tricks Of The Restaurant Trade, it was discovered that Greggs' cream of tomato soup contained much more sugar than was disclosed in its nutritional information.

While a 300g portion was said to contain 5.7g of sugar, that amount of soup was found to contain 25.4g when tested: almost five times the amount declared on the package. In response, Greggs said that they would "review the methodology used to determine nutritional data and would reformulate the recipe if required".

Discontinued products

Macaroni pie
Greggs previously sold a macaroni pie, which was a water crust pastry case filled with macaroni pasta and a cream cheese sauce. It was announced in June 2015 that the company would be discontinuing the pie from its Scottish menu as Greggs was looking to "refresh" the pastries they offered.

The news of the removal of the pie angered many customers in Scotland, and campaigns soon began calling for Greggs to keep the pie. A huge campaign started on social media with Scots pleading with Greggs to #savethepie. A petition was started which gained nearly 2,000 supporters, and the topic of the discontinuing of the pie was discussed in the Scottish Parliament.

Bread
In November 2015, Greggs decided to discontinue selling bread, with the company stating that the products were not selling as well as their sandwiches and other products. The company also mentioned that bread was still being sold in a few stores and that they were now focusing on "food on the go" products as customer habits were changing. The traditional north east loaf, the Stottie, is still sold in many branches in the north east of England.

Balanced Choice pasties
In September 2016, in response to rising obesity levels in the United Kingdom, Greggs introduced a range of sourdough pasties which are under four hundred calories. The Balanced Choice Bakes are in Greggs' healthy Balanced Choice range.

Marketing
In July 2002, American actress and model Milla Jovovich, a fan of the store and its pasties, said that she would be willing to become the "face of Greggs" in a new marketing campaign if the firm approached her. However, no such approach was made.

Greggs Rewards
In February 2014, Greggs launched an electronic loyalty scheme app called "Greggs Rewards".

Pasty tax
In March 2012, Chancellor of the Exchequer George Osborne proposed to simplify the taxing of takeaway food. In the United Kingdom, most food intended to be cooked and eaten at home is zero rated, meaning that businesses do not have to charge their customers the standard VAT on those products.

With the pasty tax, any food besides freshly baked bread which is sold while above room temperature would be subject to the 20% VAT charge with no exception for intended serving temperature. Chairman of the company, Derek Netherton warned that such a tax would lead to "further unemployment, high street closures and reduced investment". Greggs participated in a campaign to reverse this decision, which became known as the "pasty tax" or "Pasty Gate".

Greggs: More Than Meats the Pie
An eight part documentary series, called Greggs: More Than Meats The Pie, which goes behind the scenes of the bakery and all its areas, was broadcast on Sky1 and Sky1 HD in April 2013. Sky revealed the documentary programme's first episode was Sky1's number one original show in April, with a final total of 1.27 million viewers.

References

External links

 Corporate site
 Consumer site
 Yahoo profile

1939 establishments in England
Bakeries of the United Kingdom
British companies established in 1939
Companies based in Newcastle upon Tyne
Companies listed on the London Stock Exchange
Doughnut shops
English brands
Fast-food chains of the United Kingdom
Food and drink companies established in 1939
Restaurants established in 1939
Retail companies established in 1939
Retail companies of the United Kingdom